Sheldon F. Kahn (born March 1, 1940) is a film editor and producer. He was jointly awarded the BAFTA Award for Best Editing, with Lynzee Klingman and Richard Chew, for their work on One Flew Over the Cuckoo's Nest.

Filmography
 One Flew Over the Cuckoo's Nest
 Same Time, Next Year
 The Electric Horseman
 Private Benjamin
 Ghostbusters
 Out of Africa
 La Bamba
 Kindergarten Cop
 Ghostbusters II
 Beethoven's 2nd
 Space Jam
 My Super Ex-Girlfriend

Awards
Kahn has been nominated for the following awards:
 Academy Award for Best Film Editing for Out of Africa
 Academy Award for Best Film Editing for One Flew Over the Cuckoo's Nest
 American Cinema Editors Award for Best Edited Feature Film for Out of Africa
 American Cinema Editors Award for Best Edited Feature Film for One Flew Over the Cuckoo's Nest

External links

1940 births
Living people
American film editors
American film producers
Best Editing BAFTA Award winners